TSV Hannover-Burgdorf is a handball club from Hannover, Germany, and is competing in the Handball-Bundesliga.

History
The team is known as DIE RECKEN. The origins of the club lie with the sports association Freie Turnerschaft Burgdorf, which was founded in 1922, with a handball department. In 1946 the Turn- und Sportvereinigung Burgdorf was founded. TSV Burgdorf became TSV Hannover-Burgdorf Handball GmbH in 2005. The matches of the top teams have been played since 2005 in one of the two sports arenas in Hannover, the Swiss Life Hall with a capacity of 4,460 spectators, or the ZAG-Arena where 10,767 spectators can cheer on the team. Given the increasing number of supporters, since 2018 more and more games have been played in the second hall.

Crest, colours, supporters

Naming history

Kit manufacturers

Team

Current squad
Squad for the 2022–23 season

Goalkeepers
1  Domenico Ebner
 21  Dario Quenstedt
Left wingers
 74  Vincent Büchner
Right wingers
 19  Marius Steinhauser  
 28  Maximilian Gerbl 
Line players
4  Bastian Roscheck
 14  Evgeni Pevnov
 44  Ilija Brozović

Left backs
 23  Uladzislau Kulesh 
 42  Martin Hanne
 56  Hannes Feise
Centre Backs
8  Veit Mävers
 22  Marian Michalczik
 26  Jonathan Edvardsson
Right backs
2  Branko Vujović 
 10  Renārs Uščins

Technical staff
 Head coach:  Christian Prokop
 Assistant coach:  Heiðmar Felixson
 Athletic Trainer:  Timm Kostrzewa
 Physiotherapist:  Johannes Bode
 Club doctor:  Dr. Marcus Schönaich

Transfers
Transfers for the 2023–24 season

Joining
  Simon Gade (GK) (from  Aalborg Håndbold)
  Kentin Mahé (CB) (from  Telekom Veszprém) ?
  Tilen Strmljan (CB) (from  RK Celje) ?

Leaving
  Domenico Ebner (GK) (to  SC DHfK Leipzig Handball)

Previous squads

EHF ranking

Former club members

Notable former players

  Fabian Böhm (2016–2022)
  Jan-Fiete Buschmann (2009–2015)
  Sven-Sören Christophersen (2014–2018)
  Domenico Ebner (2019–)
  Kai Häfner (2014–2019)
  Timo Kastening (2008–2020)
  Nikolas Katsigiannis (2010–2012)
  Jörg-Uwe Lütt (2004–2008)
  Marian Michalczik (2022–)
  Evgeni Pevnov (2017–)
  Dario Quenstedt (2022–)
  Bastian Roscheck (2021–)
  Erik Schmidt (2015–2017)
  Martin Ziemer (2012–2019)
  David Szlezak (2008)
  Renato Rui (2006)
  Ilija Brozović (2017–)
  Ivan Martinović (2019–2022)
  Roberto Julián Duranona (2003–2004)
  Jóhan Hansen (2020–2022)
  Casper Ulrich Mortensen (2016–2018)
  Morten Olsen (2010–2013, 2015–2020)
  Mait Patrail (2012–2020)
  Tamás Mocsai (2012–2013)
  Nenad Puljezević (2009–2013)
  Heiðmar Felixson (2004–2009)
  Ólafur Guðmundsson (2014–2015)
  Ásgeir Örn Hallgrímsson (2010–2012)
  Hannes Jón Jónsson (2008–2012)
  Rúnar Kárason (2013–2018)
  Vignir Svavarsson (2010–2012)
  Sigurbergur Sveinsson (2011)
  Aivis Jurdžs (2009–2013)
  Robertas Paužuolis (2005–2010)
  Andrius Stelmokas (2008–2010)
  Filip Mirkulovski (2015)
  Filip Kuzmanovski (2020-2023) 
  Vasko Ševaljević (2013–2015)
  Branko Vujović (2022–)
  Joakim Hykkerud (2012–2017)
  Jacek Będzikowski (2008–2011)
  Piotr Przybecki (2009–2012)
  Tomasz Tłuczyński (2005–2009)
  Adam Weiner (2011–2014)
  Pavel Atman (2017–2019)
  Aleksandr Tuchkin (2004–2005)
  Nejc Cehte (2018–2022)
  Urban Lesjak (2018–2022)
  Borut Mačkovšek (2013–2014)
  Juan Andreu (2012–2015)
  Álvaro Ferrer Vecilla (2014)
  Cristian Ugalde (2018–2020)
  Maximilian Gerbl (2022–)
  Csaba Szücs (2011–2017)

Former coaches

References

External links
 Official website

German handball clubs
Handball-Bundesliga
Sport in Hanover
Handball clubs established in 1912
1912 establishments in Germany